Stoby is a locality situated in Hässleholm Municipality, Scania County, Sweden with 745 inhabitants in 2010.

References 

Populated places in Hässleholm Municipality
Populated places in Skåne County